Derma may refer to:

 Dermis
 Derma, Mississippi
 Intestine, for use in cooking
 Kishke (Jewish food), or stuffed derma